Flåvær is group of islets and skerries in the Herøyfjord in the municipality of Herøy in Møre og Romsdal county, Norway.  The islands are located north of the island Gurskøya and southwest of the town of Fosnavåg.  It includes the islets Flåvær, Husholmen, Torvholmen, and Vardholmen (the Norwegian term holme translates as islet, signifying that these are small).

History
In earlier times, there was extensive activity at Flåvær due to its central position in the Herøyfjord. Flåvær was both a fishing station and a store where the fishing fleet could get supplies close to the fishing fields. It provided useful harbor and mooring facilities. In the days of the rich herring fisheries, the harbor was often crowded with fishing vessels, and as many as 1,500 people gathered there. From 1873 to 1976 there was a post office.  Also, from 1929 to 1961 and again from 1981 until 1984, a school was located here. The Flåvær fyrstasjon, which was erected on Vardholmen in 1870, is still located there.

By 1981, Flåvær had only 14 remaining inhabitants on the four islets.  Today Flåvær is depopulated, but it is possible to spend a vacation in the cottages there and to arrange for conferences on Flåvær and Torvholmen.

Panorama view

See also
List of islands of Norway

References

External links
 Turistverksemd

Herøy, Møre og Romsdal
Islands of Møre og Romsdal
Villages in Norway (depopulated)
Former populated places in Møre og Romsdal
Uninhabited islands of Norway
Sunnmøre
Skerries